The 1977 Pacific Cup was the second edition of the Pacific Cup, a rugby league tournament held between Pacific teams. The tournament was hosted by New Zealand and eventually won by the New Zealand Māori side, who defeated Western Australia 35-12 in the final.

Background
The 1977 Pacific Cup was run by the New South Wales Rugby League, following the success of the inaugural 1975 Pacific Cup. The tournament involved three Australian state sides as well as Papua New Guinea, who did not yet have Test match status, and the New Zealand Māori. In the end the 1977 Pacific Cup proved to be expensive to run and resulted in the cancellation of the planned 1979 Pacific Cup.

Squads
Coached by Tom Newton, the New Zealand Māori squad included Dick Uluave, James Leuluai, Dennis Key, Rick Muru, John Wilson, Josh Liavaa and Ian Bell.

Results
An opening ceremony was held at Turangawaewae Marae in Huntly.

Round 1

Round 2

Round 3

Round 4

Round 5

Final

References

External links
International Competitions 1977 The Vault

Pacific Cup
1977
Pac
Pacific Cup
1977 in Oceanian sport